Basket Liga Kobiet (BLK), currently known for sponsorship reasons as Energa Basket Liga Kobiet (EBLK; 2001–2013 Polska Liga Koszykówki Kobiet, PLKK) is a professional women's club basketball league in Poland. It constitutes the first and highest-tier level of the Polish league pyramid. The winning team of the final round are crowned the Polish Champions of that season.

The BLK, which is played under FIBA rules, currently consists of 11 teams (professional basketball's clubs). A BLK season is split into a league stage and a playoffs stage. At the end of the league stage, the top eight teams qualify for the playoff stage.

History
Founded in 1929, it has been carried out every year since except for 1936 and World War II. Wisła Kraków is the most successful team in the championship with 25 titles, followed by AZS Warsaw, Lotos Gdynia and ŁKS Łódź with fourteen, eleven and nine respectively. Gdynia holds the longest winning streak with eight titles in a row between 1998 and 2005.

2022–23 teams

2020–21 teams

League championships

In 2022-23 European competitions

See also 
 Sports in Poland
 Basketball in Poland
 Polish basketball league system
 Polish Basketball League

References

External links
 Official Website

Basketball leagues in Poland
Poland
Sports leagues established in 1928
lea
1928 establishments in Poland
Professional sports leagues in Poland